Diego Nargiso (born 15 March 1970) is a former tennis player from Italy.

Having turned professional in 1987, Nargiso represented his native country at the 1988 Summer Olympics in Seoul, where he was defeated in the second round by America's eventual runner-up Tim Mayotte. He also competed in the men's doubles at the 1992 and 1996 Olympics.

Nargiso was the first Italian tennis player to win the Junior Wimbledon championship, which he did in 1987.

The left-handed Nargiso reached his highest singles ATP-ranking on 10 October 1988, when he became the number 67 in the world.

ATP career finals

Singles: 2 (2 runner-ups)

Doubles: 20 (5 titles, 15 runner-ups)

ATP Challenger and ITF Futures finals

Singles: 7 (3–4)

Doubles: 13 (5–8)

Junior Grand Slam finals

Singles: 1 (1 title)

Doubles: 2 (1 title, 1 runner-up)

Performance timelines

Singles

Doubles

Mixed doubles

References

External links
 
 
 

1970 births
Living people
Italian male tennis players
Olympic tennis players of Italy
Tennis players from Naples
Tennis players at the 1988 Summer Olympics
Tennis players at the 1992 Summer Olympics
Tennis players at the 1996 Summer Olympics
US Open (tennis) junior champions
Wimbledon junior champions
Grand Slam (tennis) champions in boys' singles
Grand Slam (tennis) champions in boys' doubles
20th-century Italian people